Blanca Rosana Ugarte Guzmán (born 1959), better known as Poly Ugarte, is an Ecuadorian activist, lawyer, and politician.

Biography
Poly Ugarte was born in 1959 in the Puerto Bolívar parish of Machala Canton. She completed high school at La Asunción school and her higher education at the Universidad Católica de Santiago de Guayaquil, where she obtained a law degree.

She began her political career in 1992 in support of the presidential candidacy of conservative Jaime Nebot. She was one of the councilors who voted in favor of the construction of Malecón 2000.

In the 1998 legislative election, she was chosen national deputy representing Guayas Province for the same party. She served in this position until 2003.

Years later, Ugarte returned to politics for the PSC, and won a seat as a member of the National Assembly representing Guayas in the 2017 legislative elections. At the end of 2018, she disenrolled from the PSC and resigned her position to participate as a candidate for the prefecture of Guayas Province for the Creating Opportunities party.

Activism
In 2006, she was diagnosed with breast cancer, which led her to create the Poly Ugarte Foundation with the goal of promoting the prevention of the disease. In October 2007, the foundation began its "Tócate" (Touch Yourself) campaign. In its first three years of operation, the foundation served more than 120,000 women for free.

Since then it has carried out campaigns, marches, and equipped mobile clinics in various Ecuadorian cities. It also has a service center in Guayaquil.

References

External links
 

1959 births
Creating Opportunities politicians
Ecuadorian activists
Ecuadorian women activists
20th-century Ecuadorian lawyers
Women members of the National Assembly (Ecuador)
Ecuadorian women lawyers
Living people
Members of the National Assembly (Ecuador)

Members of the National Congress (Ecuador)
People from Machala
Social Christian Party (Ecuador) politicians
Universidad Católica de Santiago de Guayaquil alumni
21st-century Ecuadorian women politicians
21st-century Ecuadorian politicians